Marcos Esteban Quiroga (born June 16, 1988 in San Juan, Argentina) is an Argentine footballer currently playing for Naval of the Primera División B in Chile.

Teams
  Sportivo Desamparados 2007-2008
  San Martín de San Juan 2008-2009
  Sportivo Desamparados 2009-2010
  Gimnasia y Esgrima de Mendoza 2010-2011
  Naval 2011–present

External links
 
 

1988 births
Living people
Argentine footballers
Argentine expatriate footballers
Gimnasia y Esgrima de Mendoza footballers
San Martín de San Juan footballers
Sportivo Desamparados footballers
Naval de Talcahuano footballers
Primera B de Chile players
Expatriate footballers in Chile
Association football forwards
People from San Juan, Argentina
Sportspeople from San Juan Province, Argentina
Argentine expatriate sportspeople in Chile